is a biography series produced by Tsuburaya Productions created to commemorate the 25th anniversary of Ultraman Dyna. It features the main casts, Alien Metron "Marluru" of Ultraman Trigger: New Generation Tiga and Deban from Ultraman Tiga as navigators in an old house welcoming guests as they describe the past exploits of Ultraman Dyna and Ultraman Trigger in their respective shows.

The show premiered on TV Tokyo on January 29, 2022, effectively a week after the end of Ultraman Trigger: New Generation Tiga.

Episodes

Cast
: M・A・O
: 
: 
: 
: 
:

Theme song

Lyrics & Composition: 
Arrangement: 
Artist:

References

External links
Ultraman Chronicle D at TV Tokyo 

2022 Japanese television series debuts
Ultra television series
TV Tokyo original programming